Abū Bakr al-Zubaydī, also known as Muḥammad ibn al-Ḥasan ibn ‘Abd Allāh ibn Madḥīj al-Faqīh and Muḥammad ibn al-Ḥasan al-Zubaydī al-Ishbīlī, held the title Akhbār al-fuquhā and wrote books on topics including philology, biography, history, philosophy, law, lexicology, and hadith.

Life
Al-Zubaydī was a native of Seville, al-Andalus (present-day Spain), whose ancestor, Bishr al-Dākhil ibn Ḥazm of Yemeni origin, had come with the Umayyads to al-Andalus from Ḥimṣ in the Levant (Syria). Al-Zubaydī moved to Córdoba, the seat of the Umayyad Caliphate, to study under Abū ‘Alī al-Qālī. His scholarship on the philologist Sībawayh’s grammar, Al-Kitāb, led to his appointment as tutor to the son of the humanist caliph Ḥakam II, the crown prince Hishām II. At the Caliph’s encouragement, al-Zubaydī composed many books on philology, and biographies of philologists and lexicographers. He became qāḍī of Seville, where he died in 989.

Works
Al-Istidrāk ‘alā Sībawayh fī Kitāb al-abniya wa’l-ziyāda ‘alā mā awradahu fīhi muhadhdhab (Rome, 1890) (Baghdād, 1970), (Riyad, 1987)
Ṭabaqāt al-Naḥwīyīn wa-al-Lughawīyīn ‘Categories of Grammarians and Linguists’; (973–6) Biographical dictionary of the early philologists and lexicographers of the Basran, Kufan and Baghdād schools; almost contemporaneous with Ibn al-Nadim's Al-Fihrist. Both works bear witness to the emergence of the science of Arabic philology, and to the close intellectual contact between the Abbāsid and Umayyad seats of power at Baghdād and Cordoba, respectively. (Cairo, 1954)
Akhbār al-fuquhā; al-muta’akhkhirīn min ahl Qurṭuba; History of the jurisconsults of Córdoba
Amthilat al-abniya fī Kitāb Sībawayh Tafsīr Abī Bakr al-Zubaydī
Basṭ al-Bāri’
Al-ghāya fi ‘l-arūḍ
Ikhtiṣār; Selections from Bukhārī’s Ṣaḥīḥ in Francisco Pons y Boigues
Istidrāk al-ghalaṭ al-wāqi’ fī Kitāb al-‘Ayn
Laḥn al-‘awāmm; dialectical speech errors; ed., R. 'Abd al-Tawwāb, Cairo 1964.
Mukhtaṣar al-Ayn ‘Selections from Al-Ayn of Khalīl ibn Aḥmad’ (before 976)
Al-Mustadrak min al-ziyāda fī Kitab al-Bāri’ alā Kitāb al-‘Ayn
Al-radd ‘alā Ibn Masarra, or Hatk sutūr al-mulḥidīn
Risālat al-intiṣār li ‘l-Khalīl
Al-Tahdhīb bi-muḥkam al-tartīb from the Laḥn al-ʻāmmah
Al-Taqrīz
Al-wāḍīḥ fī ‘ilm al-‘arabiyya; grammar after Sībawayh (Cairo, 1975), ('Ammān, 1976)
Al-ziyadat ‘alā kitāb 'iṣlaḥ laḥn al-ʻaāmmah bi-al-Andalus

See also
List of Arab scientists and scholars

References

Bibliography

10th-century births
989 deaths
Year of birth uncertain
People from Seville
10th-century historians from al-Andalus
10th-century biographers
10th-century philologists
10th-century lexicographers
10th-century Arabic writers
Al-Andalus encyclopedists
Arab biographers
Arab grammarians
Arab lexicographers
Medieval grammarians of Arabic
Encyclopedists of the medieval Islamic world
People from Córdoba, Spain
Philologists of Arabic